Charles McCorrie (or McCurry) VC (1830 – 8 April 1857) was born in Killead, County Antrim and was an Irish recipient of the Victoria Cross, the highest and most prestigious award for gallantry in the face of the enemy that can be awarded to British and Commonwealth forces.

Details

He was approx. 25 years old, and a private in the 57th Regiment (later Middlesex Regiment (Duke of Cambridge's Own)), British Army, during the Crimean War when the following deed took place for which he was awarded the VC.

On 23 June 1855 at Sebastopol, in the Crimea, Private McCorrie threw over the parapet a live shell which had been thrown from the enemy's battery.

He died in Malta on 8 April 1857.

References

The Register of the Victoria Cross (1981, 1988 and 1997)

Ireland's VCs  (Dept of Economic Development, 1995)
Monuments to Courage (David Harvey, 1999)
Irish Winners of the Victoria Cross (Richard Doherty & David Truesdale, 2000)

External links
The Middlesex Regiment 1755-1966 (detailed history of the original "Die Hards")
 Monument in Malta 

Crimean War recipients of the Victoria Cross
Irish recipients of the Victoria Cross
British Army personnel of the Crimean War
Middlesex Regiment soldiers
People from County Antrim
1830 births
1857 deaths
19th-century Irish people
Irish soldiers in the British Army
British Army recipients of the Victoria Cross
Military personnel from County Antrim